Alec Shane Benjamin (born May 28, 1994) is an American singer-songwriter from Phoenix, Arizona. His 2018 breakthrough single "Let Me Down Slowly" reached the top 40 in over 25 countries and has amassed over 1.24 billion streams on Spotify as of March 2023. Benjamin primarily writes and sings songs in English, but has released versions of his songs "Older", "The Way You Felt", "Water Fountain", "Devil Doesn't Bargain", “Shadow of Mine”, and "Nuance" in Mandarin Chinese.

Early life 
Benjamin was born and raised in Phoenix, Arizona, and lived in Long Island, New York during kindergarten and first grade.

He has a sister, for whom he wrote his song "If We Have Each Other".

Career 
Initially, Benjamin signed to Columbia Records while still enrolled at University of Southern California. However, Columbia Records ended their partnership weeks after he submitted his album. Despite this, he went on a self-funded tour in Europe to open for Marina Kaye in France, and Lea in Germany. He promoted his music by performing in parking lots outside concert venues and handing out business cards to passersby.

Benjamin's mixtape Narrated for You was released on November 16, 2018. It features the songs "Water Fountain", "Outrunning Karma", and "Let Me Down Slowly", the latter was later re-released as a single with Alessia Cara. While promoting the mixtape, he created the "Can I Sing for You?" videos on YouTube, in which he performs his written songs in acoustic to people in public.

Benjamin's debut album These Two Windows was released on May 29, 2020. It peaked at number 8 on Billboard'''s Top Album Sales chart. His second album, (Un)Commentary'', followed on April 15, 2022.

Personal life 
He has stated in interviews that he suffers from social anxiety and OCD.

Influences
Benjamin has cited influences such as Eminem, John Mayer, Jason Mraz, Paul Simon, and Chris Martin of Coldplay. He has also expressed admiration for Kendrick Lamar and classic singer-songwriters such as Joni Mitchell, Leonard Cohen, Carole King, and Jackson Browne.

Discography

Studio albums

Mixtapes

Extended plays

Singles

As lead artist

As featured artist

Other certified songs

Demos

Notes

References

External links
 Official website

American male singer-songwriters
American singer-songwriters
Living people
Place of birth missing (living people)
1994 births
21st-century American male singers
21st-century American singers